Sarah Christine Blakeslee (born May 16, 1985, in Vancouver, Washington) is an American sport shooter. She won a silver medal in small-bore rifle three positions at the 2003 Pan American Games in Santo Domingo, Dominican Republic, and was selected to compete for Team USA, as a 19-year-old at the 2004 Summer Olympics. A former resident athlete of the U.S. Olympic Training Center in Colorado Springs, Colorado, Blakeslee trained rigorously for the national rifle shooting team under the tutelage of David Johnson.

Blakeslee's sporting debut in the worldwide scene came as an eighteen-year-old teen at the 2003 Pan American Games in Santo Domingo, Dominican Republic. There, she nailed down the silver in the rifle three positions at 668.2, losing the title to Cuba's Eglis Yaima Cruz by a slim 0.3-point deficit. With a noteworthy runner-up finish and a specific qualifying standard required in the selection, Blakeslee secured an Olympic berth for Team USA on her first Games.

At the 2004 Summer Olympics in Athens, Blakeslee qualified for the U.S. shooting team in the 50 m rifle 3 positions, after finishing ahead of her teammate Morgan Hicks for first place at the Olympic trials in Fort Benning, Georgia four months earlier. A less experienced to the international scene, Blakeslee marked a brilliant 197 in prone, 185 in standing, and 189 in the kneeling series to put up a much steadfast aim in a three-way tie with Cruz and Finland's Marjo Yli-Kiikka for twentieth place. Blakeslee's qualifying score of 571 was just eight points short of the final cutoff and six away from her Hicks, who placed twelfth.

References

External links

1985 births
Living people
American female sport shooters
Olympic shooters of the United States
Shooters at the 2004 Summer Olympics
Shooters at the 2003 Pan American Games
Pan American Games silver medalists for the United States
Sportspeople from Vancouver, Washington
Pan American Games medalists in shooting
Medalists at the 2003 Pan American Games
21st-century American women
20th-century American women